Sayed Hussain Alami Balkhi most known as Alami Balkhi is a citizen of Afghanistan and a former representative to the Wolesi Jirga, the lower house of its national legislature.
He was elected to represent Kabul Province in 2005.

Early life 
Sayed Hussain Alami Balkhi, son of Sayed Mir Aqa, was born on 1957 in Charkint district of Balkh province.
He is from the Hazara ethnic group of Sayed family.
According to the report he is 
"associated with [Yunus] Qanuni's political faction.
According to the report he is the chair of the Justice Committee.  
According to the report he may have a PhD.
According to the report he "is the deputy in the National Unity Front."

References

External links 

 afghan-bios.info/Alami Balkhi

Living people
1957 births
Members of the House of the People (Afghanistan)
Hazara politicians